The 1968–69 Scottish Inter-District Championship was a rugby union competition for Scotland's district teams.

This season saw the 16th Scottish Inter-District Championship.

South won the competition with 3 wins.

1968-69 League Table

Results

Round 1

South: 

Glasgow District:

Round 2

 South: 

North and Midlands:

Round 3

North and Midlands:

Edinburgh District:

Round 4

Glasgow District: 

Edinburgh District:

Round 5

South: 

Edinburgh District:

Round 6

Glasgow District: 

North and Midlands:

Matches outwith the Championship

Other Scottish matches

Scottish Districts: 

Australia: 

Glasgow Districts: 

Anglo-Scots:

Trial matches

Blues Trial: 

Whites Trial: 

Edinburgh District: 

Anglo-Scots:

English matches

International matches

References

1968–69 in Scottish rugby union
Scottish Inter-District Championship seasons